Si Yan or Sri Yan is a neighbourhood in Thanon Nakhon Chai Si Subdistrict, Dusit District, Bangkok.  It roughly occupies the four-way intersection of the same name. The area famous for its market and  restaurants with street food.

History & location
Si Yan Intersection is where Samsen (which runs along Chao Phraya River from the north end of Bang Lamphu) cuts across Nakhon Chai Si Roads (which runs in a directly east–west) from Rama VI Road in neighbouring Phaya Thai District up until end at Payap pier on Chao Phraya River.

Payap pier area used to be the residence of Prince Dilok Nopparat, the son of King Chulalongkorn (Rama V) who was born from the Royal Concubine Thipkesorn, who are descended from the Chet Ton Dynasty. The pier was therefore used as a place where members of the Chet Ton Dynasty came to visit him in Bangkok by boat. At the end of the King Chulalongkorn's reign, it was the place where the new generation of nobles housed.

At present, Payap pier (N18) is one of the piers of the Chao Phraya Express Boat provides a service that takes passengers from downtown Bangkok to downtown Nonthaburi.

Si Yan is one of the oldest neighbourhoods in Samsen. It is both a market and a community of Thais and Thais of Chinese descent with a long history, at least contemporary with the World War II era. In that era, it was a place where there was a bomb shelter.

Trams used to run on Samsen Road between 1900 and 1968, passing Si Yan as well.

Nowadays, the nameplate over the market entrance is still spelled "สรีย่าน" according to the old spelling.

Neighbourhoods
Bang Krabue
Kiak Kai

References

Dusit district
Neighbourhoods of Bangkok
Road junctions in Bangkok
Retail markets in Bangkok
Food markets